Mycosphaerella pistaciarum is a fungal plant pathogen.

See also
 List of Mycosphaerella species

References

Fungal plant pathogens and diseases
pistaciarum
Fungi described in 1956